In the field of mathematical optimization, stochastic programming is a framework for modeling optimization problems that involve uncertainty. A stochastic program is an optimization problem in which some or all problem parameters are uncertain, but follow known probability distributions. This framework contrasts with deterministic optimization, in which all problem parameters are assumed to be known exactly. The goal of stochastic programming is to find a decision which both optimizes some criteria chosen by the decision maker, and appropriately accounts for the uncertainty of the problem parameters. Because many real-world decisions involve uncertainty, stochastic programming has found applications in a broad range of areas ranging from finance to transportation to energy optimization.

Two-stage problems
The basic idea of two-stage stochastic programming is that (optimal) decisions should be based on data available at the time the decisions are made and cannot depend on future observations. The two-stage formulation is widely used in stochastic programming. The general formulation of a two-stage stochastic programming problem is given by:

where  is the optimal value of the second-stage problem

The classical two-stage linear stochastic programming problems can be formulated as

where  is the optimal value of the second-stage problem

In such formulation  is the first-stage decision variable vector,  is the second-stage decision variable vector, and  contains the data of the second-stage problem. In this formulation, at the first stage we have to make a "here-and-now" decision  before the realization of the uncertain data , viewed as a random vector, is known. At the second stage, after a realization of  becomes available, we optimize our behavior by solving an appropriate optimization problem.

At the first stage we optimize (minimize in the above formulation) the cost  of the first-stage decision plus the expected cost of the (optimal) second-stage decision.

The considered two-stage problem is linear because the objective functions and the constraints are linear. Conceptually this is not essential and one can consider more general two-stage stochastic programs. For example, if the first-stage problem is integer, one could add integrality constraints to the first-stage problem so that the feasible set is discrete. Non-linear objectives and constraints could also be incorporated if needed.

Distributional assumption 
The formulation of the above two-stage problem assumes that the second-stage data  is modeled as a random vector with a known probability distribution. This would be justified in many situations. For example, the distribution of  could be inferred from historical data if one assumes that the distribution does not significantly change over the considered period of time.

Discretization 
To solve the two-stage stochastic problem numerically, one often needs to assume that the random vector  has a finite number of possible realizations, called scenarios, say , with respective probability masses . Then the expectation in the first-stage problem's objective function can be written as the summation:

and, moreover, the two-stage problem can be formulated as one large linear programming problem (this is called the deterministic equivalent of the original problem, see section ).

When  has an infinite (or very large) number of possible realizations the standard approach is then to represent this distribution by scenarios. This approach raises three questions, namely:

 How to construct scenarios, see ;
 How to solve the deterministic equivalent. Optimizers such as CPLEX, and GLPK can solve large linear/nonlinear problems. The NEOS Server, hosted at the University of Wisconsin, Madison, allows free access to many modern solvers. The structure of a deterministic equivalent is particularly amenable to apply decomposition methods, such as Benders' decomposition or scenario decomposition;
 How to measure quality of the obtained solution with respect to the "true" optimum.

These questions are not independent. For example, the number of scenarios constructed will affect both the tractability of the deterministic equivalent and the quality of the obtained solutions.

Stochastic linear programming
A stochastic linear program is a specific instance of the classical two-stage stochastic program. A stochastic LP is built from a collection of multi-period linear programs (LPs), each having the same structure but somewhat different data. The  two-period LP, representing the  scenario, may be regarded as having the following form:

The vectors  and  contain the first-period variables, whose values must be chosen immediately. The vector  contains all of the variables for subsequent periods. The constraints  involve only first-period variables and are the same in every scenario. The other constraints involve variables of later periods and differ in some respects from scenario to scenario, reflecting uncertainty about the future.

Note that solving the  two-period LP is equivalent to assuming the  scenario in the second period with no uncertainty. In order to incorporate uncertainties in the second stage, one should assign probabilities to different scenarios and solve the corresponding deterministic equivalent.

Deterministic equivalent of a stochastic problem
With a finite number of scenarios, two-stage stochastic linear programs can be modelled as large linear programming problems. This formulation is often called the deterministic equivalent linear program, or abbreviated to deterministic equivalent. (Strictly speaking a deterministic equivalent is any mathematical program that can be used to compute the optimal first-stage decision, so these will exist for continuous probability distributions as well, when one can represent the second-stage cost in some closed form.)
For example, to form the deterministic equivalent to the above stochastic linear program, we assign a probability  to each scenario . Then we can minimize the expected value of the objective, subject to the constraints from all scenarios:

We have a different vector  of later-period variables for each scenario . As a result, the constraints involving just  and  need only be specified once, while the remaining constraints must be given separately for each scenario.

Scenario construction 
In practice it might be possible to construct scenarios by eliciting experts' opinions on the future. The number of constructed scenarios should be relatively modest so that the obtained deterministic equivalent can be solved with reasonable computational effort. It is often claimed that a solution that is optimal using only a few scenarios provides more adaptable plans than one that assumes a single scenario only. In some cases such a claim could be verified by a simulation. In theory some measures of guarantee that an obtained solution solves the original problem with reasonable accuracy. Typically in applications only the first stage optimal solution  has a practical value since almost always a "true" realization of the random data will be different from the set of constructed (generated) scenarios.

Such exponential growth of the number of scenarios makes model development using expert opinion very difficult even for reasonable size . The situation becomes even worse if some random components of  have continuous distributions.

Monte Carlo sampling and Sample Average Approximation (SAA) Method

A common approach to reduce the scenario set to a manageable size is by using Monte Carlo simulation. Suppose the total number of scenarios is very large or even infinite. Suppose further that we can generate a sample  of  replications of the random vector . Usually the sample is assumed to be independent and identically distributed (i.i.d sample). Given a sample, the expectation function  is approximated by the sample average

and consequently the first-stage problem is given by

This formulation is known as the Sample Average Approximation method. The SAA problem is a function of the considered sample and in that sense is random. For a given sample  the SAA problem is of the same form as a two-stage stochastic linear programming problem with the scenarios ., each taken with the same probability .

Statistical inference 

Consider the following stochastic programming problem

In the framework of two-stage stochastic programming,  is given by the optimal value of the corresponding second-stage problem.

Assume that  is well defined and finite valued for all . This implies that for every  the value  is finite almost surely.

Suppose that we have a sample  of realizations of the random vector . Then we can formulate a corresponding sample average approximation

Moreover, under mild additional conditions the convergence is uniform.

Consistency of SAA estimators

Suppose the feasible set  of the SAA problem is fixed, i.e., it is independent of the sample. Let  and  be the optimal value and the set of optimal solutions, respectively, of the true problem and let  and  be the optimal value and the set of optimal solutions, respectively, of the SAA problem.

 Let  and  be a sequence of (deterministic) real valued functions. The following two properties are equivalent:
 for any  and any sequence  converging to  it follows that  converges to 
 Suppose that there exists a compact set  such that
 the set  of optimal solutions of the true problem is nonempty and is contained in 
 the function  is finite valued and continuous on 
Note that  denotes the deviation of set  from set , defined as

In some situations the feasible set  of the SAA problem is estimated, then the corresponding SAA problem takes the form

where  is a subset of  depending on the sample and therefore is random. Nevertheless, consistency results for SAA estimators can still be derived under some additional assumptions:
 Suppose that there exists a compact set  such that
 the set  of optimal solutions of the true problem is nonempty and is contained in 
 the function  is finite valued and continuous on 
 if  and  converges with probability 1 to a point , then 
 for some point  there exists a sequence  such that  with probability 1.

Asymptotics of the SAA optimal value 

Suppose the sample  is i.i.d. and fix a point . Moreover, by the central limit theorem we have that

In other words,  has asymptotically normal distribution, i.e., for large ,  has approximately normal distribution with mean  and variance . This leads to the following (approximate) % confidence interval for :

 

where  (here  denotes the cdf of the standard normal distribution) and

Applications and Examples

Biological applications 
Stochastic dynamic programming is frequently used to model animal behaviour in such fields as behavioural ecology.  Empirical tests of models of optimal foraging, life-history transitions such as fledging in birds and egg laying in parasitoid wasps have shown the value of this modelling technique in explaining the evolution of behavioural decision making.  These models are typically many-staged, rather than two-staged.

Economic applications
Stochastic dynamic programming is a useful tool in understanding decision making under uncertainty. The accumulation of capital stock under uncertainty is one example; often it is used by resource economists to analyze bioeconomic problems where the uncertainty enters in such as weather, etc.

Example: multistage portfolio optimization 

The following is an example from finance of multi-stage stochastic programming.
Suppose that at time  we have initial capital  to invest in  assets. Suppose further that we are allowed to rebalance our portfolio at times  but without injecting additional cash into it. At each period  we make a decision about redistributing the current wealth  among the  assets. Let  be the initial amounts invested in the n assets. We require that each  is nonnegative and that the balance equation  should hold.

Consider the total returns  for each period . This forms a vector-valued random process . At time period , we can rebalance the portfolio by specifying the amounts  invested in the respective assets. At that time the returns in the first period have been realized so it is reasonable to use this information in the rebalancing decision. Thus, the second-stage decisions, at time , are actually functions of realization of the random vector , i.e., . Similarly, at time  the decision  is a function  of the available information given by  the history of the random process up to time .

where in period  the wealth  is given by

which depends on the realization of the random process and the decisions up to time .

Suppose the objective is to maximize the expected utility of this wealth at the last period, that is, to consider the problem

Optimization is performed over all implementable and feasible policies. To complete the problem description one also needs to define the probability distribution of the random process . This can be done in various ways. For example, one can construct a particular scenario tree defining time evolution of the process. If at every stage the random return of each asset is allowed to have two continuations, independent of other assets, then the total number of scenarios is 

In order to write dynamic programming equations, consider the above multistage problem backward in time. At the last stage , a realization   of the random process is known and  has been chosen. Therefore, one needs to solve the following problem

where  denotes the conditional expectation of  given .

Similarly, at stages , one should solve the problem

Finally, at stage , one solves the problem

Stagewise independent random process 

For a general distribution of the process , it may be hard to solve these dynamic programming equations. That is,  is the optimal value of the problem

Software tools

Modelling languages
All discrete stochastic programming problems can be represented with any algebraic modeling language, manually implementing explicit or implicit non-anticipativity to make sure the resulting model respects the structure of the information made available at each stage. 
An instance of an SP problem generated by a general modelling language tends to grow quite large (linearly in the number of scenarios), and its matrix loses the structure that is intrinsic to this class of problems, which could otherwise be exploited at solution time by specific decomposition algorithms.
Extensions to modelling languages specifically designed for SP are starting to appear, see:
AIMMS - supports the definition of SP problems
EMP SP (Extended Mathematical Programming for Stochastic Programming) - a module of GAMS created to facilitate stochastic programming (includes keywords for parametric distributions, chance constraints and risk measures such as  Value at risk and  Expected shortfall).
SAMPL - a set of extensions to AMPL specifically designed to express stochastic programs (includes syntax for chance constraints, integrated chance constraints and Robust Optimization problems)
They both can generate SMPS instance level format, which conveys in a non-redundant form the structure of the problem to the solver.

See also

 Correlation gap
 EMP for Stochastic Programming
 Entropic value at risk
 FortSP
  SAMPL algebraic modeling language
 Scenario optimization
 Stochastic optimization
 Chance-constrained portfolio selection

References

Further reading
 John R. Birge and François V. Louveaux. Introduction to Stochastic Programming. Springer Verlag, New York, 1997.
 
 G. Ch. Pflug:  Optimization of Stochastic Models. The Interface between Simulation and Optimization. Kluwer, Dordrecht, 1996.
 András Prékopa. Stochastic Programming. Kluwer Academic Publishers, Dordrecht, 1995.
 Andrzej Ruszczynski and Alexander Shapiro (eds.) (2003) Stochastic Programming. Handbooks in Operations Research and Management Science, Vol. 10, Elsevier.
 
 Stein W. Wallace and William T. Ziemba (eds.) (2005) Applications of Stochastic Programming. MPS-SIAM Book Series on Optimization 5

External links
 Stochastic Programming Community Home Page

Stochastic optimization
Optimization algorithms and methods